Milicja Obywatelska, in English known as the Citizens' Militia and commonly abbreviated to MO, was the national police organization of the Polish People's Republic. It was established on 7 October 1944 by the Polish Committee of National Liberation, effectively replacing the pre-war police force. The Citizen's Militia would remain the predominant means of policing in Poland until 10 May 1990, when it was transformed back into Policja.

The term milicja had been adapted from the cognate term, militsiya, used in several communist countries. The term is derived from militia, which derives its etymology from the concept of a military force composed of ordinary citizens. In most cases it represented a state-controlled force used to exert political repression, especially with its elite ZOMO squads.

Under both communist and post-communist governments, the Polish police system has traditionally operated under the auspices of national authority. Starting at the end of World War II, Poland went under the influence of the Soviet Union. In 1948, the country's turn toward Stalinism brought the beginning of totalitarian rule, "in which one Party ruled autonomously over all sections of society". Training for the force was conducted in the town of Legionowo.

History 
The Citizens' Militia was created on the basis of provisions of the PKWN Manifesto of the Polish National Liberation Committee and the decree on the establishment of MO of October 7, 1944 and organizationally subordinated to Public Security Department. The first generation officers and agents were drawn from the following groups and sectors of society:
 servicemen from the Polish People's Army on secondment
 partisans of the Armia Ludowa
 civilians with party affiliation (Polish Workers' Party, Polish People's Party and Polish Socialist Party)

Former members of the underground (eg  Armii Krajowej), who tried to ensure an influence on everyday life, joined the new force. It even happened that the entire outposts were Armia Krajowa, at least at the beginning of their creation people's power. The cadre of the Citizens' Militia was supplemented by about a thousand former policemen employed in 1945, mainly in positions requiring special qualifications. The officers of the Citizens' Militia took the same solemn oath as the officers of the Security Service. Its main fragment read as follows:

The first chief commander of MO was Franciszek Jóźwiak.
The militia was then subordinated to Ministry of Public Security, and from 1955 to  Ministry of Internal Affairs. From March 1946 to the end of the 1940s, local MO units with units of the Polish People's Army, Internal Security Corps, Ministry of Public Security and  Border Protection were subordinated to provincial security committees subordinate to  State Security Commission. In the years 1944–1948, the Citizens' Militia was used to fight   cursed soldiers' ', as well as servicemen of the Ukrainian Insurgent Army and German Werwolf elements.

The decrees and the first organizational structure 
When on July 27, 1944, the Civic Militia was established by one of the two decrees of the Polish Committee of National Liberation (PKWN's decree was approved on August 15, 1944 by the National National Council), in Rzeczpospolita - "press organ of the Polish Committee of National Liberation" - August 16 1944  was provided with:

Given the fact that the first generation officers and men of the MO were drawn partly from the armed force the MO sported military ranks, a tradition shared with the other Warsaw Pact police forces.

Rise of terrorism
Due to increasing terrorist threats, the MO created the Wydział Zabezpieczenia (Security Department) on February 22, 1976. This consist of 47 officers assigned to five sections.

Organisation

When the MO was first organized in 1945, it comprised the following:

 Main Office (Kancelaria główna)
 Political and Educational Board (Zarząd polityczno-wychowawczy)
 Investigation Service Board (Oddział służby śledczej)
 External Service Branch (Oddział służby zewnętrznej)
 Operational Battalion (Batalion operacyjny)
 Personnel Department (Wydział personalny)
 Finance and Economic Department (Wydział Finansowy i gospodarczy)

Until 1950, Poland was divided to 16 provinces. It was only from 1950-1975 when the country was divided to 17 provinces and five cities with voivodeship rights.

The MO had 20 municipal headquarters.

The Citizens' Militia was divided into a Public Order Department, Traffic Militia (Highway patrol), Criminal Investigations (Major crimes, forensics), Investigations Militia and an Infrastructure Security Section (Security of government buildings, airports, installations).

The ZOMO motorized riot troops, which played the most visible role in quelling demonstrations in 1980 and 1981, were reduced in size somewhat by the early 1990s and renamed Preventive Units of the Citizens' Militia (—OPMO). OPMO forces are restricted to roles such as crowd control at sporting events, ensuring safety in natural disasters, and assisting the regular police. In theory, higher government authority would be required for large OPMO contingents to be used.

From the 1960s through the 1980s, ORMO forces, which at one time numbered as many as 600,000 civilian volunteers, were used to augment regular police personnel at key trouble spots. In the early 1980s, ORMO harassed Solidarity members and prevented independent groups from organizing. Largely staffed by industrial workers who gained substantial privileges by monitoring their peers in the workplace, ORMO was the object of extreme resentment throughout the 1980s. Kiszczak attempted to promote ORMO as a valuable auxiliary police force, but the organization was abolished by the Sejm in 1990.

Ranks and uniform 
As a general rule, the MO wore grey and sky blue uniforms. The full dress variant of this was worn with the peaked cap, service dress was the same but the riot police wore combat helmets.

Transportation
The most common types were:

See also
Ministry of Public Security (UB)

References

 The history of the police in Poland from WWII to the present

Polish People's Republic
Defunct law enforcement agencies of Poland
Law enforcement in communist states
Communism in Poland
Eastern Bloc
Poland